Mutholy is a village in Kottayam district of Kerala State in India on the west side of the City of Pala. Mutholy Gramapanchayath lies on both sides of the Meenachil River. Its nearly 5 km away from the town of Palai. Total area: 18.12 sq km. and population: 15267.

See also
Panthathala
Pala, Kerala

References

Villages in Kottayam district